Rapides-des-Joachims is a municipality and village in western Quebec, Canada, part of Pontiac County in the Outaouais region. The village is situated on Rapides-des-Joachims Island (l'île de Rapides-des-Joachims) on the Ottawa River, about 100 km northwest of Fort-Coulonge. It is also known as Swisha.

Rapides-des-Joachims is isolated from the rest of Quebec's road network because the only paved road link to the village is through Rolphton, Ontario. It is the only community on the Quebec side of the Ottawa River between Sheenboro and Témiscaming. Because it is also isolated from Quebec's telecommunications network, the community is part of Rolphton's telephone exchange area, and is consequently served by Ontario's area code 613 rather than Quebec's area code 819.

History

The site had long been inhabited by the indigenous people before Europeans arrived. The explorers and voyageurs of the seventeenth and eighteenth centuries would travel on the Ottawa River to the west and at the foot of the rapids, they would have established a resting place and may have given it the name of an explorer.

It was a busy place during the seventeenth century, when a mission post was set up along the river where a Hudson's Bay Company trading post had been established at the foot of the "Long Rapids", as they were called at the time.

But the place was called Rapides des Joachims de l'Estang in a memorandum of 1686 by Jacques-René de Brisay, Governor of New France, to Marquis de Seignelay, and named Portage de Joachim de l'Estan on a map of Franquelin of 1688. Another document from 1699 shows Joachim de l'Estang. The Joachims are sons of Michel Mathieu Brunet dit Lestang, colonist who arrived in New France on 20 August 1657.

However, both in Quebec and in Ontario, the name Swisha, Sweshaw, or Shesha Rapids has also long been used for this location as a map of 1790 indicates. Swisha is an obvious distortion of the French pronunciation of "Joachim".

In 1863, Stanislas Drapeau described Rapides des Joachims and Rapides des Deux Joachims as "the most important place for navigation on the Ottawa River and flourished thanks to the logging industry."

By 1871 it had become a small village complete with a telegraph office of the Montreal Telegraph Company. The river steamers had to stop here because it was the head of navigation on the Ottawa River. In 1886 the Oblate Fathers built a frame church in the village, which was used until 1922, when a new church was built.

In 1948, the construction of a dam and hydro-electric station began and the rapids which gave the town its name disappeared.

The municipality was incorporated in 1955 when it was formed out of the Sheen-Esher-Aberdeen-Malakoff United Townships. It adopted its present name of Rapides-des-Joachims, which had already been assigned to the post office created about 100 years earlier in 1853. Its first mayor was J.H. Madore. Subsequently in 1960, the territory of the former Aberdeen Township was added to the municipality.

Geography
The municipality covers a vast sparsely populated area characterized by boreal forest, lakes, and streams. Prior to the construction of a hydro-electric dam in 1950, the village's site was not an island. The rising water flooded the old river bed from the north through Lake McConnell. The dam can be bypassed on one of the Ottawa Navigable Waterway bypasses, connecting the Pembroke stretch of the Ottawa River to the upstream section to Mattawa.

Climate
Rapides-des-Joachims has a humid continental climate with four distinct seasons. Summers are warm to hot, with significant rainfall. Winters are cold for its low latitude, with significant snowfall.

Demographics

Population

Language

Economy

Since Rapides-des-Joachims provides access to vast tracts of wilderness, including ZEC Dumoine, it depends largely on the hunting and fishing business. It is the long-time base of a charter float plane company (Air Swisha, formerly Bradley Air Service/First Air), operating a de Havilland Canada DHC-2 Beaver.

The economy depends also on logging and the Commonwealth Plywood Mill.

Local government

List of former mayors:
 Gérald Dagg (... –2005)
 Dale Lévesque (2005–2009)
 James Gibson (2009–2021)
 Doug Rousselle (2021–present)

See also
 List of municipalities in Quebec

References

External links

Pontiac MRC Gateway
Virtual Museum - Swisha Project

Municipalities in Quebec
Incorporated places in Outaouais